Yanta District is one of 11 urban districts of the prefecture-level city of Xi'an, the capital of Shaanxi Province, Northwest China. The district borders the districts of Weiyang to the north, Lianhu, Beilin and Xincheng to the northeast, and Chang'an to the south.

Geography

Administrative Divisions

Yanta District administers ten subdistricts:

Education

International schools in the district include:
 Xi'an International School
 Xi'an Hanova International School

Universities in the district include:
 Xi'an International University
 Xi'an Jiaotong University (XJTU)
 Chang'an University
 Xidian University
 Xi'an University of Posts & Telecommunications (西安邮电大学）
 
High school in the district include:
 High School Affiliated to Shaanxi Normal University

References

External links

Districts of Xi'an